Bubele Kitie Mhlana is a South African naval officer.

He was born in the Ngangelizwe township in Mthatha.

Military career 
He is a former Umkhonto weSizwe (MK) operative and joined the South African Navy in 1994. He assumed command of the minesweeper  in 2003

In 1999 he attended the Officers Course at the South African Naval College and spent 9 months attending the International Principal Warfare Officer (A) course with the British Royal Navy.

He commanded the Valour Class Frigate  in 2007
In 2009 he attended the United States Naval War College He then commanded  as well as serving as Commander of the Frigate Squadron

He was appointed Flag Officer Fleet and promoted to rear admiral in 2014 In 2020 he was appointed Chief of Staff for the SANDF Joint Operations Division  and Deputy Chief of the Navy from 1 February 2023.
.

Honours and awards
 
 
 
 
  Tamandaré Medal of Merit (Brazil)

In 2012 he was awarded the Tamandaré Medal of Merit from Brazil.

References

South African admirals
Living people
Naval War College alumni
UMkhonto we Sizwe personnel
People from Mthatha
Year of birth missing (living people)